State Road 52 (SR 52) is the major east–west road through northern Pasco County, Florida. The road begins in Bayonet Point at US 19 (SR 55), passes south of San Antonio and St. Leo, and terminates on the south side of Dade City at US 98 and US 301.

Route description
SR 52 exists primarily as a six-lane commercial strip between US 19 and Moon Lake Road. In 2007, the road was widened to six lanes between Moon Lake Road and SR 589 (Suncoast Parkway), but most of the development taking place here has been residential so far. On the Southeast corner of the Suncoast Parkway interchange are a Florida State Police barracks and a Florida Division of Forestry fire tower. The road narrows down to four lanes and then two as it enters Fivay Junction and approaches Shady Hills Road before crossing the Pithlachascotee River. As the road runs along the north side of some agricultural land, it eventually meets with a railroad crossing and then passes a sawmill before encountering US 41 (SR 45) at a section of Pasco County which is known as Gowers Corner. Plans to widen SR 52 near US 41 include the realignment of both roads.

East of US 41 is a community known as the Pilot Country Estates Airport, where residents have their private airplanes.  Beyond that, most of the features surrounding SR 52 consist of fledgling farmland and little lakes. At least one other gated community exists east of this point. Other sites along this segment include the Dirt Devil's Speedway and a concrete factory on the southwest corner of CR 583 (Ehren Cutoff). A winery was established at some point in the early 21st Century, and a model aviation club existed in one of two locations along this road segment.

After a pair of bridges over two dry creeks, SR 52 encounters Bellamy Brothers Boulevard (CR 581 North), which leads drivers north through farms and woods before entering the Brooksville. Meanwhile, SR 52 climbs a hill and then drops before approaching the Pasco County Juvenile Detention Center. Almost immediately, the road enters the unincorporated hamlet of Pasco as it crosses a former railroad right-of-way that once ran from St. Petersburg to Trilby. The interchange with I-75 (exit 285) is easily visible before reaching the former grade crossing, but not without approaching a gated community and two truck stops.

Immediately after the I-75 interchange, SR 52 passes by an industrial park and Recreational Vehicle dealership. Continuing east, SR 52 bisects the Mirada development before intersecting CR 577 (Curley Road) immediately south of San Antonio. Continuing east south of St. Leo, SR 52 curves northeast to avoid Williams Cemetery before intersecting with CR 579 (Prospect Road) on the southeast side of the town. Continuing east from this intersection as Clinton Avenue, SR 52 then proceeds to curve back southeast before curving back east again through the small residential community of Lake Pasadena Heights and Clinton Heights before terminating at an intersection with US 98 and US 301 on the south side of Dade City.

History
Former segments of SR 52, have included Roth Lane, in Saint Leo, and North 21st Street and Lock Street in Dade City. 

It opened to traffic on February 17, 2023, costing $82 million. The former alignment was transferred to Pasco County as County Road 52 (CR 52).

Major intersections

Related routes

County Road 52 Alternate (CR 52 Alt) was the bannered route of SR 52 south of Dade City. It began at an intersection with CR 579 on the southeast corner of St. Leo just south of the intersection with the former alignment of SR 52 and ran east along Clinton Street through the communities of Lake Pasadena Heights and Clinton Heights before terminating at an intersection with US 98 and US 301 on the south side of Dade City. It was incorporated into SR 52 following its realignment on February 17, 2023.

County Road 52 (CR 52) is a county route of SR 52 between west of San Antonio and Dade City. It is a former alignment of SR 52 before its realignment to a  four-lane divided highway segment to the south. It begins at an intersection with SR 52 west of its intersection with Mirada Boulevard, diverging to the northeast. It then proceeds to run east through San Antonio and St. Leo before running northeast and entering Dade City, where it turns north and becomes 21st Street, before turning right onto Meridian Avenue and running east through Downtown Dade City before terminating at an intersection with US 98 and US 301.

References

External links

Florida Route Log (SR 52)

052
052
Dade City, Florida